The École nationale de chimie physique et biologie de Paris (ENCPB), renamed in 2009 "lycée Pierre-Gilles-de-Gennes - ENCPB" after physicist Pierre-Gilles de Gennes died in 2007, is a public secondary and higher school specialising in technical and scientific subjects and preparatory classes to the grandes écoles (CPGE). It is located at 11 rue Pirandello in the 13th arrondissement of Paris.

History and courses 

With a desire to create a public institution for the training of lab technicians at baccalauréat level and higher technicians following the growth in sciences in the post-war period, the stated created the ENCPB in 1953. The school took its first 50 students in 1955 at a site on rue Corvisart in the 13th arrondissement of Paris. The first move for the school was to rue du Banquier in 1958. From 1961 to 1971, the ENCPB joined with a number of technician training institutions, including the Institut d'Arsonval (8, rue Rollin in Paris 5th), the research centre for l'Oréal (Avenue Gabriel Péri at La Courneuve) and a school in Dijon.

With the construction from 1970 to 1973 of a new location on rue Pirandello on the former site of the Delahaye automobiles factory (1898–1954), the ENCPB diversified its courses with the creation of classes préparatoires aux grandes écoles in the sections of MP, PC, BCPST and TB.

Lycée rankings 

In 2016, the lycée was ranked 81st out of 110 at départemental level in terms of teaching quality, and 1205th at national level. The ranking is based on three criteria: the bac results, the proportion of students who obtain their baccalauréat after spending their last two years at the establishment, and the added value (calculated based on the social origin of the students, their age, and their national diploma results).

CPGE rankings 

The national rankings for preparatory classes to the grandes écoles (CPGE) are the admission rates for students to the most reputable French grandes écoles.

In 2015, the magazine L'Étudiant gave the following rankings for 2014 :

In 1984, the ENCPB adopted the reforms to higher education, and offered a national diploma of Brevet de technicien supérieur (BTS), creating sections for:

Chemistry
Physics
Medical biology analysis (formerly BTS biological analysis)
Bioanalysis and control (formerly BTS Biochemistry before 2005)
Biotechnology
Quality in the food and bio-industries
Water studies

The also offered technological baccalauréats (as they are now known):

STL physics
STL chemistry
STL control regulation
STL biochemistry and biological engineering

They also offered post-BTS courses from 1984 to 2007, which became "professional licences":

Functional genomics
Biomedical instrumentation and maintenance
Hospital hygiene (training for biohygienists)
Double competence in chemistry regulation
Organic synthesis
Formulation
Medical imaging and therapeutic radiology was added to the existing BTS, before in 2012, with health reforms, becoming a diploma at bac+3

The ENCPB have developed partnerships with the École normale supérieure de Cachan and the Université Paris VII allowing students to study at these institutions, but also with a training centre for technical teachers for the Kingdom of Morocco in chemical engineering. The ENCPB actively takes part in European programmes (Erasmus, Comett...).

After the death in 2007 of physician Pierre-Gilles de Gennes, Nobel Prize laureate, the ENCPB was renamed "lycée Pierre-Gilles-de-Gennes - ENCPB" after him, and became a general and technological lycée with the development of a general S (SVT and SI) stream parallel to the lab technology stream.

Distribution 

Currently, the ENCPB has 1920 students in four study cycles:
 31% in general scientific and technological baccalauréats
 20% in preparatory classes for grandes écoles
 45% in BTS
 4% in post-BTS

Filming location 

During the construction of the new ENCPB building, the filming of Juliette et Juliette (released in 1974) took place on site. This was particularly due to the proximity of two cafés, located face to face on the corner of a block. This configuration exactly met the needs of the film (one of the cafés was turned into a restaurant during the filming).

More recently, the entrance to the ENCPB was used for the décor of the film Caché (2005) by Michael Haneke, particularly in the final scene, where the key to understanding the film takes place. In 2010, the school was used for scenes in the telefilm Obsessions by Frédéric Tellier where the laboratories stand in for "Laboratoire de la police scientifique".

Alumni 
 Didier Baichère

Access 

The ENCPB is served by the Metro lines 5 at the station Campo-Formio and 7 at the station Les Gobelins, as well as the Bus (RATP) lines:
  stop Banquier
  stop Jenner - Jeanne d'Arc
  stop Saint-Marcel - Jeanne d'Arc

Notes and references

External links 
 

Lycées in Paris
13th arrondissement of Paris